The 1952 Ladies Open Championships was held at the Lansdowne Club in London from 9 December 1951 – 16 December 1951. Janet Morgan won her third consecutive title defeating Joan Curry once again in the final. The competition was held during 1951 but formed part of the 1951/1952 season.

Seeds

Draw and results

First round

seed *

Second round

Third round

Quarter-finals

Semi-finals

Final

References

Women's British Open Squash Championships
Women's British Open Squash Championships
Women's British Open Squash Championships
Squash competitions in London
Women's British Open Championships
British Open Championships 
Women's British Open Squash Championships